Charles Randolph Uncles, SSJ (November 8, 1859 — July 20, 1933) was an African-American Catholic priest. In 1891, he became the first such priest ordained on US soil. Two years later, he co-founded the Society of St. Joseph of the Sacred Heart (a.k.a. the Josephites), formed to minister to the African American community.

Biography 
The son of Lorenzo and Anna Marie (Buchanan) Uncles, Charles was raised in East Baltimore, Maryland.

The Mill Hill Missionary Society (whose American branch would later become the Josephites) recruited a number of candidates to become priests for their North American mission. In the end, Uncles was the only one. He studied at St. Peter's Apostolic School in Liverpool, England for the task.

On returning to the U.S., he studied at St. Joseph Seminary in Baltimore. He also took classes at St. Mary's Seminary in Baltimore, which had previously refused to accept him due to his being Black. He was ordained to the priesthood in December 1891 at the Cathedral of the Assumption by Cardinal James Gibbons.

In 1893, the US provincial for the Mill Hill Fathers, Fr John R. Slattery, requested that the society's American operations be broken off into its own society, to which the Superior General acquiesced. The Josephites were then formed with the Mill Hill priests who wished to remain, including Uncles.

From 1891 to 1925, Uncles taught mainly at Epiphany Apostolic College in Baltimore and New Windsor, New York.

While residing at Epiphany College, Uncles fell ill and died July 20, 1933, considering himself to be an outcast from the Society due to the racism he experienced therein. He was buried in the college's cemetery, but was exhumed in the 1970s and reburied at Calvary Cemetery in the Josephite Plot.

References

External links 
Agnes Kane, "Meeting the Pioneers of Black Catholicism", National Black Catholic Congress (2008 archived copy)

1933 deaths
American Roman Catholic priests
Religious leaders from Baltimore
African-American Roman Catholic priests
Founders of Catholic religious communities
Josephite Fathers
1859 births
20th-century African-American people
St. Joseph's Seminary (Washington, DC)
African-American Catholic consecrated religious